Briseño (also anglicized as Briseno) is a Spanish surname. Notable people with the surname include:
Alberto Medina Briseño (born 1983), Mexican footballer
Antonio Briseño (born 1994), Mexican footballer
Gilberto Landeros Briseño, Mexican military personnel
Guadalupe Briseño (born 1933), American civil rights activist and the leader of the Kitayama Carnation Strike
Humberto Briseño Sierra (1914–2003), Mexican lawyer
José Luis Briones Briseño (born 1963), Mexican politician
Severiano Briseño (1902–1988), Mexican composer

See also
Briceño, the more popular variant

Spanish-language surnames